Patrick Andersson may refer to:

 Patrik Andersson (born 1971), Swedish former football defender
 Patrick Andersson (footballer, born 1970), Swedish former football midfielder